Kim So-yeon (born 23 January 1970) is a labor activist in the Republic of Korea and currently on the executive committee of Creating a World Without a Temporary Worker.

Education 
 Graduated from Seoul Jeonghwa Girls' Commercial High School.

Biography 
 1987: Led the struggle for increasing accessibility to private schools in Seoul while she was attending Jeonghwa Girl's Commercial High School.
 1997: Served as chairperson of the Eucalyptus Electronics Union.
 2001: Sentenced to ten years in prison with two years probation for violating the National Security Act during the Seoul Democratic Labor Convention.
 5 July 2005: Named as Korean Confederation of Trade Unions Chairperson for the newly formed Metal Union Seoul Branch, Metal Union Southern Regional Branch, and Metal Union Kiryung Electronics Branch.
 24 August – 17 October 2005: Insisted to Kiryung Electronics that workers were illegally laid-off, withdrawing the union contract. For 55 days, part of the production line for Kiryung Electronics Factory was occupied for 16 members of the company via an all-night vigil.
 17 October 2005: Detained on suspicion of interrupting business.
 24 August – 22 September 2006: Kiryung Electronics underwent a 30-day Hunger strike, demanding the return of illegally laid-off workers.
 11 June – 12 September 2008: Kiryung Electronics underwent a 94-day hunger strike, demanding the return of illegally laid-off workers.
 August 2010: Kiryung Electronics requires regulation of illegally laid-off workers, embracing a high concentration of foreigners.
 1 November 2010: After a negotiation period of 1,895 days, Kiryung Electronics finally reaches a new full-time employment agreement with the KCTU.
 June - November 2011: Worked on the Hope Bus Planning Team of the 2010-11 Hanjin Heavy Industries strike.
 2012: First served as a network executive for Creating a World Without a Temporary Worker.
 11 November 2012: Elected as the presidential candidate for workers by the election headquarters of Creating a World Without a Temporary Worker. Also ran as an independent for the 2012 South Korean Presidential Election, along with Park Jong-sun, Kang Ji-won, and Kim Soon-ja.
 15 December 2012: After completing a campaign stop at Gwanghwamun Plaza in Seoul, Kim and 300 supporters clashed with police while marching towards the Blue House.
 19 December 2012: Finished in 5th place in the 18th Presidential Election of South Korea.

References

1970 births
Living people
People from Seoul
South Korean presidential candidates, 2012
Korean trade unionists
South Korean human rights activists
21st-century South Korean women politicians
21st-century South Korean politicians